A number of species of lizard are named rainbow ameiva, including:

 Holcosus amphigrammus
 Holcosus gaigeae
 Holcosus hartwegi
 Holcosus parvus
 Holcosus sinister
 Holcosus stuarti
 Holcosus thomasi
 Holcosus undulatus